A referendum was held in Iran on 26 January 1963 by the decree of Mohammad Reza Shah, with an aim to show popular support for him, asking voters to approve or veto the reforms of the White Revolution.

Women were not officially allowed to vote, but were set up to vote at their own balloting counters and dedicated boxes, at the suggestion of Ministry of Agriculture Hasan Arsanjani. The results gave Iranian women the right to vote.

Criticism 
Despite the apparent benign nature of the proposals in the referendum, there was significant opposition. Opponents included major landowners, ulema and communists.

Ayatollah Ruhollah Khomeini called for boycotting the referendum as "un-Islamic".

National Front boycotted the referendum, criticizing that the measures did not come from the parliament.

Voters were asked six questions, but had only the option to vote yes or no to the total package.

The ballots for 'Yes' were white, while the negative ones were green.

Similar to the previous referendum, polling places lacked secrecy and there were two separate voting booths: one for the supporters and one for the opponents. "No sane man would enter the opposition booth", according to Mohammad Gholi Majd.

Party policies

Results

Aftermath

Following the referendum dissension and riots outbroke in almost all major urban areas, most significantly in Tehran and the city of Qom. The Shah gave orders to immediate suppression of the opposition and National Front, Freedom Movement, Tudeh Party and religious activists were imprisoned. The unrest made Ayatollah Ruhollah Khomeini the regime's principal opponent in the minds of most Iranians.

References 

Referendums in Iran
Iran
Constitutional referendum
Suffrage referendums
Electoral reform referendums
Privatisation referendums
Women's rights in Iran